The Ajax Experience was a museum dedicated to AFC Ajax' club history in Amsterdam in the Netherlands. The museum, located at the Rembrandtplein, was opened on 24 September 2011 and closed within two years after a 9 million euro loss.

History 
On 24 September 2011, Ajax Amsterdam opened the Ajax Experience as an attempt to bring the World of Ajax tour closer to Amsterdam-Centrum. Designed by Sid Lee and Gsmprjct°, the Ajax Experience was an interactive experience which shared the philosophy of the club with the public, as well as bring the audience closer to the likes of Johan Cruijff, Marco van Basten or Wesley Sneijder. Various national and international trophies that were won by the club over the years were on public display as well. With an estimated 3,5 million to 4,5 million fans in the Netherlands, and even more abroad, the Ajax Experience aimed to cater to the various fans who not only frequent the Amsterdam ArenA or Sportpark De Toekomst, but also those who are visiting Amsterdam as a tourist destination who are not looking to deviate too far from the trusted central area near by frequented destinations such as  Stopera, Joods Historisch Museum, Tunfun, or Artis.

Location
Situated on the famed Rembrandtsplein in Amsterdam-Centrum in a former ABN-AMRO banking facility, the 1,400 m2 space proved to be optimal to provide the needed room to supply an interactive experience which featured cinematic match summaries, while showcasing the overall successes and big names associated with the club on the historic downtown square.

Dissolution
On 23 July 2013 it was announced that Ajax would discontinue the Ajax Experience, citing a loss in revenue as the cause for the discontinuation of the establishment. The World of Ajax situated at the stadium would however continue to serve as a touristic function for the club, while the fanshop situated at the same location as the Experience remained open until 1 February 2014. The club made a reported €9 Million loss over the course of two years through the museum, which resulted in its immediate shutdown only 2 years after its opening day.

See also
World of Ajax

References

External links 
 Ajax Experience on projectcredits.com

2011 establishments in the Netherlands
AFC Ajax facilities
Association football museums and halls of fame
Museums in Amsterdam
Defunct museums in the Netherlands
21st-century architecture in the Netherlands